Mohammed Mubarak is a Qatari footballer who is a goalkeeper . His brother, Meshal Mubarak, is also a footballer and has represented the national team.

Club career statistics
Statistics accurate as of 21 August 2011

1Includes Emir of Qatar Cup.

2Includes Sheikh Jassem Cup.

3Includes AFC Champions League.

References

External links
Goalzz.com profile

1984 births
Living people
Qatari footballers
Qatar SC players
Al-Arabi SC (Qatar) players
Al Ahli SC (Doha) players
Al-Shamal SC players
Al-Waab SC players
Qatar international footballers
2011 AFC Asian Cup players
Association football goalkeepers
Qatar Stars League players
Qatari Second Division players